Licio Rossetti (born 1 November 1925 in Trieste; died 10 December 1993 in Trieste) was an Italian professional football player.

References

1925 births
1993 deaths
Italian footballers
Serie A players
U.S. Triestina Calcio 1918 players
Inter Milan players
Genoa C.F.C. players
Piacenza Calcio 1919 players
Association football midfielders